BDC (acronym for Boys Da Capo) is a South Korean trio formed by Brand New Music in 2019. The triplet consist of members Kim Si-hun, Hong Seong-jun, and Yun Jung-hwan. The group debuted on October 29, 2019, with the single album Boys Da Capo.

History

Pre-debut
The trio represented Brand New Music as a quartet alongside Lee Eun-sang in Produce X 101. Following the show's finale, none of the members earned a spot in the consequent project group, X1. Kim Si-hun ranked 27th in the third elimination round overall, while Hong Seong-jun and Yun Jung-hwan placed 51st and 35th in the second elimination round, respectively.

On October 2, 2019, the trio starred their own reality show named Boys Don't Cry, which was aired on Piki Pictures for four weeks. The show displayed their preparation before debuting, where they had to decide a name for their future group and do a street performance.

2019–2021: Debut with Boys Da Capo and The Intersection series
On October 16, 2019, a teaser image of the trio was released, revealing "BDC" as the name of the group and their debut date. About two weeks later, on October 29, BDC released their special single album Boys Da Capo with the lead single "Remember Me", in which member Kim Si-hun participated in the choreography composition. Then, on November 24, they held their first fan meeting titled "BDC 1st FAN MEETING: REMEMBER YOU" at Yonsei University's Centennial Hall.

On September 23, 2020, BDC released their first EP The Intersection: Belief with "Shoot The Moon" serving as the lead single. Despite being the second release of the group, this EP was considered as their official debut.

On March 8, 2021, BDC released their second EP The Intersection: Discovery with "Moon Rider" serving as the lead single. On May 9, they held an online fan meeting titled "2021 BDC ONLINE FANMEETING 'al Fine'" through the video platform FC Live.

On June 30, BDC released their third EP The Intersection: Contact with "Moonlight" serving as the lead single.

On August 10, BDC released the special single "Moon Walker". The song, which was co-written by member Kim Sihun, was intended to be the finale or epilogue of "The Intersection" series. It was recorded at the same time as the lead single from the previous EP. 

On August 18, they released the single "Stop Now" which was produced by Bumkey as a part of the cyberbullying prevention campaign from the Blue Tree Foundation. 

On October 1, they released their debut Japanese single "Moon Walker" which includes the Japanese version of "Moon Walker" and "Moon Rider" digitally.

2022: Blue Sky
On June 15, 2022, BDC had their first comeback approximately after 10 months with the single album Blue Sky and its lead single of the same name.

Members
Kim Si-hun (김시훈)
Hong Seong-jun (홍성준)
Yun Jung-hwan (윤정환)

Discography

Extended plays

Single albums

Singles

As lead artist

Promotional

Collaborations

Filmography

Television series

Web shows

Notes

References

K-pop music groups
South Korean boy bands
South Korean dance music groups
Musical groups from Seoul
Musical groups established in 2019
2019 establishments in South Korea
South Korean pop music groups
Brand New Music artists
Peak Time contestants